The Beacon Hill transmitting station is an English telecommunications facility located at Beacon Hill, Marldon, Devon. It includes a guyed mast (Beacon Hill A) and a free-standing lattice tower (Beacon Hill B), both of which support various antennas.

History
Beacon Hill A became operational in 1972–3, bringing 625 line PAL colour television to the coverage area of Torbay and south Devon. Beacon Hill B transmits FM radio and DAB radio to the area. In 2007, a third guyed lattice mast was constructed at the site to provide medium wave transmissions for Gold (Exeter/Torbay). The transmitter for Gold was dismantled after the service was discontinued.

Digital switchover
In April 2009, the analogue television transmissions at Beacon Hill A were turned off, requiring homes in the area to switch to the Freeview service. The Beacon Hill transmitter group was the first in the South West of England to stop broadcasting analogue television services. BBC Two ceased at 00:50 on 8 April 2009 and the remaining analogue signals were turned off on 22 April 2009 at 00:20.

Services listed by frequency

Analogue radio

Digital radio

Digital television

700MHz clearance

The 700MHz clearance programme led to the removal of some of the Freeview HD and SD channels from the Beacon Hill transmitter. Prior to 27 March 2019, Beacon Hill used to transmit these services:

Before switchover

Analogue television
Analogue television signals ceased in April 2009. BBC2 was closed on 8 April 2009, with ITV Westcountry temporarily moving into its place, followed by the remaining services on 22 April.

References

External links
Beacon Hill at mds975.co.uk
Beacon Hill at The Transmission Gallery

Buildings and structures in Devon
Transmitter sites in England